Boulevard (formerly known as The Boulevard) is a Long Island/New York City regional variety magazine owned by Anton Media Group. Founded in 1985, it was well received as a bi-monthly newspaper inserted into selected weekly newspapers in and around Long Island's Gold Coast. The glossy magazine was relaunched in 2016 after a 5-year hiatus as a quarterly publication.

History
The magazine began as a newspaper featuring mostly charity events, minor celebrity stories and special features that catered to the North Shore communities, commonly referred to the "Gold Coast". Boulevard expanded to cover both Nassau and Suffolk counties including The Hamptons. The latest incarnation of Boulevard covers topics of national interest.

Newspaper to magazine
In October 2006, publisher and CEO Angela Susan Anton transformed Boulevard into a glossy magazine, with Dina Lohan, mother of Lindsay Lohan, featured as that the September/October issue cover subject. Patrick McMullan signed on as the magazine's lead photographer.

The magazine's first three issues contained additional sections of Travel, Design, Charity Events, Celebs, The Island, Fashion, Wine & Dine and Photo Gallery. By the fourth issue, the magazine underwent slight design changes, streamlining the colors and better defining the sections. The sections changed were: Charity Events to Events, The Island to Lifestyle, Celebs to Profiles, and a Health Section was added. By October 2007, the magazine added Music, Art, Sports and Business.

Actor Joe Gannascoli, guitarist John Lilley of The Hooters, News 12 News Correspondent Gina Glickman and Q104.3 DJ Jonathan Clarke all have written for the magazine, with Clarke as a regular contributor.

As of April 2008, Boulevard was circulated via Anton Community Newspapers to 70 communities in the North Shore of Nassau County. It is distributed to over 400 locations on Long Island. Readership is about 180,000 (estimated).

In November 2016, Boulevard was circulated via Anton Media Group to the communities in their coverage area. Future issues will be available for purchase on newsstands. The publisher Angela Susan Anton appeared on the cover. New editor-in-chief Jennifer Fauci wrote a history of the publisher and the publication Also included within the pages are features on The Theodore Roosevelt Museum at Old Orchard, Andrew Zimmern, Gregg Allman, Baiting Hollow Farm Vineyard and Horse Rescue, La Selva mansion and owner Debra Del Vecchio's beekeeping, the Broadway show On Your Feet!, New York Fashion Week, Melissa McBride of The Walking Dead (TV series), Jacques Torres, H. Jon Benjamin, Maria Rodale's cookbook Scratch, and Angela Susan Anton's social diary and charities she supports.

Boulevard Online
In April 2009, Boulevard launched a revised, more interactive version of its website and branded it "B Online."  The new website offered a more streamlined look and feel as well as the ability to search articles, create events, better handling of multimedia photos and videos as well as the ability to print, pdf and email articles, as well as online advertising, Fitness Made Simple celebrity John Basedow and Q104.3 "Out of the Box" host, Jonathan Clarke, both have blogs on the website.

In November 2016, Boulevard launched a brand new website. On it readers can find new content as well as archives of the previous incarnations of Boulevard.

Covers

 October 2006 Dina Lohan
 December 2006 Dr. Max Gomez
 February 2007 Joan Jett
 April 2007 Clinton Kelly
 June 2007 Laura Bell Bundy
 August 2007 Susan Lucci
 October 2007 Steven Van Zandt
 December 2007 David Hyde Pierce
 February 2008 Jay Leno
 April 2008 Tamara Tunie
 June 2008 Joe Gannascoli, Tony Darrow
 August 2008 Anthony Michael Hall
 October 2008 Good Morning America's Sam Champion
 December 2008 Julia Ormond
 February 2009 James Taylor
 April 2009 Melora Hardin
 June 2009 Rock of Ages
 August 2009 Regina King
 October 2009 Bill Maher
 December 2009 Sandra Lee
 February 2010 Ana Ortiz
 May 2010 Beth Stern
 July 2010 Green Day
 September 2010 Selita Ebanks
 November 2010 Dr. Oz
 December 2010 Bobby Flay
 March 2011 Michelle Rodriguez
 November 2011 Angela Susan Anton

References

External links 
 Official website (US)
www.antonnews.com
www.antonmediagroup.com

Lifestyle magazines published in the United States
Bimonthly magazines published in the United States
Local interest magazines published in the United States
Publications established in 1985
Magazines established in 2006
Magazines published in New York City
Quarterly magazines published in the United States
1985 establishments in New York (state)